The Citizen Athletic Association, simply known as Citizen or TCAA, is a Hong Kong athletic club. Its football team currently competes in the Hong Kong First Division. The club has a long history in playing in the top-tier Hong Kong First Division, but decided to self-relegate in the 2013–14 season after declining to participate in the newly established Hong Kong Premier League.

The club plays its home matches at Happy Valley Recreation Ground.

Recent history

2007–08 season
Citizen won the 2007–08 Hong Kong FA Cup. The club beat Tai Po in the final by 2:0.

2009–10 season
Due to Mong Kok Stadium's renovation, Citizen used the Siu Sai Wan Sports Ground in the 2009–10 season for its home games. Former South China striker Detinho joined the club.

2010–11 season
Citizen won the 2010–11 Senior Shield by beating South China in the final after penalty kicks, thus earning the club the right to represent Hong Kong in the 2012 AFC Cup. To celebrate this victory, the club announced a prize fund of HK$800,000 (approx US$100,000), an iPhone 4 for every player and an end-of-season vacation for the whole team.

2011–12 season
The club moved from the remote Siu Sai Wan Sports Ground to the renovated Mong Kok Stadium for the 2011-12 Hong Kong First Division League season. To compete in both local football and AFC Cup, Citizen has expanded its squad to include 27 players, adding Michael Campion, So Loi Keung, Chiu Chun Kit, Amaury Nunes and Yuto Nakamura to the club, while promoting two young players Chan Si-Chun and Yeung Ho Wan. Citizen is spending an unprecedented HK$400,000 on the team's 12 days pre-season training camp in Vancouver, Canada, during which time the club will play 3 warm-up games. The club announced on 7 September that Rasonic has become its new shirt sponsor for the 2011–12 and 2012–13 seasons. The sponsorship is worth HK$1 million.

2013–14 season
The club moved from Mong Kok Stadium to Tsing Yi Sports Ground, which Citizen shared with Sun Hei as their common home ground. They decided to self-relegate at the end of the season after declining to participate in the newly established Hong Kong Premier League.

Honours

League
 Hong Kong First Division
 Runners-up (1): 2007–08
 Hong Kong Second Division
 Champions (2): 1999–2000, 2003–04

Cup Competitions
 Hong Kong Senior Shield
 Champions (1): 2010–11
 Runners-up (1): 2012–13
 Hong Kong FA Cup
 Champions (1): 2007–08
 Runners-up (1): 2009–10
 Hong Kong FA Cup Preliminary Round
 Champions (1): 2014–15

Continental record

Kit evolution

Kit sponsors and manufacturers

Recent seasons

References

External links
Citizen AA at HKFA.com
 Hong Kong Football
 Citizenfc.com Official website

 
Association football clubs established in 1947
Football clubs in Hong Kong
1947 establishments in Hong Kong